The Tweralpspitz is a mountain in the Appenzell Alps, located near Wattwil in the canton of St. Gallen. It is the highest point of the chain situated north of Ricken Pass.

References

External links
Tweralpspitz on Hikr

Mountains of the Alps
Mountains of Switzerland
Mountains of the canton of St. Gallen
Appenzell Alps